Seeman is a surname. Notable people with the surname include{
 Seeman (politician) (born 1966), Indian Tamil politician and former director
 Bonnie Seeman (born 1969), American ceramist
 Enoch Seeman (fl. 1694–1739), painter
 Jerry Seeman (1936–2013), American football official
 John Seeman, pornographic actor and director
 Melvin Seeman (1918–2020), American social psychologist
 Nadrian Seeman (born 1945), American chemist and nanoscientist
 Philip Seeman (born 1934), Canadian schizophrenia researcher and neuropharmacologist
 Roxanne Seeman (born 1954), American musician

See also
Seemann (disambiguation)
Zeeman (disambiguation)
 Seeman (film), a 1994 film